Pink Tank is the controversially painted post–World War II monument to Soviet tank crews in the Czech Republic.

Pink Tank may also refer to:
Project Pink Tank  by Rubicon Foundation
Pink Tank Café Bar, The Public, West Bromwich, England
Flying Pink Tank, a nickname of Japanese wrestler Yutaka Yoshie
Pink Tank, a nickname of Taiwan-based Malaysian singer Meeia Foo